Tamas Qalmykhambetuly Aitmukhambetov  (Tamas Qalmūhambetūly Aitmūhambetov) is a Kazakh jurist who served as the first chairman of the supreme court of Kazakhstan.

References 
  

1939 births
Living people
People from Astrakhan Oblast
Soviet jurists
Kazakhstani jurists